Chris Reynolds is a Welsh comics author who has been creating his Mauretania comics since the mid-1980s, including an homonymous full-length graphic novel publishing by Penguin Books in 1990.

In 2005, Canadian author Seth considered him "the most underrated cartoonist of the last 20 years". An anthology of his works was published to critical acclaim by New York Review Books in 2018.

References

Bibliography 
 Paul Gravett & Chris Reynolds, Chris Reynolds Interview: Mysterious Stories about Times and Places, on paulgravett.com, 9 May 2018.

External links 
 Reynold's website cinemadetectives.com.

Alternative cartoonists
British graphic novelists
British comics artists
Welsh comics writers
1960 births
Living people